Oscar B. Hord (August 31, 1829 – January 15, 1888) was an American politician and lawyer who served as the sixth Indiana Attorney General from November 3, 1862 to November 3, 1864.

Biography
Hord was born in 1829 in Maysville, Kentucky. He was the son of Francis Triplett and Elizabeth Scott (née Moss) Hord. Francis T. Hord Sr., born in Mason County, Kentucky, was a prominent lawyer, a government surveyor of the lands of the Upper Mississippi River, a Kentucky Circuit Court judge, a director of the Bank of Northern Kentucky (in Maysville), and a staunch supporter of the Union during the Civil War. Elizabeth Scott Hord was originally from King George County, Virginia, descended from an influential family originally from York County. Oscar Hord's brother, Francis T. Hord Jr. also served as Indiana Attorney General (from 1882-1886).

Hord read law at his father's office. At age twenty, Hord moved to Greensburg, Indiana, where he formed a legal partnership with Colonel James Gavin. Hord and Gavin (with assistance from Judge Cortez Ewing after Gavin went off to serve in the Civil War) wrote "Gavin & Hord's Statutes", a text that compiled and revised various state statutes and was influential in Indiana law.

In 1852, Hord, a Democrat, was elected prosecuting attorney of Decatur County. In 1862, he was elected Indiana Attorney General, serving under Republican Governor Oliver P. Morton. Hord retired from the position in 1864.

After his time as Attorney General, Hord returned to practicing law, forming a firm in Indianapolis in partnership with Thomas A. Hendricks (U.S. Senator from Indiana and later Governor of Indiana then U.S. Vice President under Grover Cleveland) and Samuel E. Perkins (Justice of the Indiana Supreme Court). Later, Abram W. Hendricks (Indiana General Assembly member and cousin of Thomas A. Hendricks) and Conrad Baker (Governor of Indiana) joined the firm. This firm evolved into the modern firm of Baker & Daniels.

Hord was a delegate to the 1876 Democratic National Convention in St. Louis, Missouri and the 1884 Democratic National Convention in Chicago, Illinois.

Hord married twice, first to a "Miss Green" of Kentucky, and then to Mary Josephine Perkins (daughter of Samuel E. Perkins, Indiana Supreme Court justice and Hord's law partner). Their son, Henry Ewing Hord (1865–1907), was a Yale University graduate and a lawyer.

Hord was part of the association that organized the construction of the Thomas A. Hendricks Monument in Indianapolis following Hendricks's death in 1885.

Hord died in 1888. Benjamin Harrison (then U.S. Senator from Indiana, later U.S. President) was one of many prominent Indiana political figures who eulogized Hord.

References

1829 births
1888 deaths
Indiana Democrats
People from Maysville, Kentucky
19th-century American lawyers
Indiana Attorneys General